The Canadian Society of Transplantation (CST) is the professional organization for physicians, surgeons, scientists and allied health professionals working in the field of transplantation in Canada. It was founded in 1980 and has grown to include over 600 members in 2008.

Description
The mission of CST is to advance the practice and science of transplantation for the benefit of Canadians and society. Its annual scientific conference, which is usually held in the spring at a ski resort, brings together CST members, representatives from transplant centres, allied health professionals working in the field, personnel from organ and tissue retrieval organizations, and others from the Canadian and international transplantation communities. The society has several special interest groups dedicated to organ specific transplantation such as heart, liver, kidney, lung, pancreas, or pediatric transplantation or to specific groups such as pharmacists or tissue typers. Its committees are active in their special areas: education, ethics, scientific program, communication, membership, policy, grants and awards, donation, basic science. CST collaborates with the Canadian Institute for Health Information to maintain the Canadian Organ Replacement Registry (CORR)

Pre.sidents
Current and past presidents of the Canadian Society of Transplantation:

 1980-1981 Pierre Robitaille
 1981-1982 Michael Robinette
 1982-1983 George deVeber
 1983-1984 John Dossetor
 1984-1985 Allan MacDonald
 1985-1986 Ronald Guttman
 1986-1987 Pierre Daloze
 1987-1988 Philip Halloran
 1988-1989 F. Neil McKenzie
 1989-1990 Carl Cardella
 1990-1991 Paul Keown
 1991-1992 Phil Belitsky
 1992-1993 John Jeffery
 1993-1994 Paul Greig
 1994-1995 David Ludwin
 1995-1996 Norman Kneteman
 1996-1997 Guy Fradet
 1997-1999 Rolf Loertscher
 1999-2000 Alan Menkis
 2000-2001 Vivian McAlister
 2001-2002 David Rush
 2002-2004 Anthony Jevnikar
 2004-2005 Heather Ross
 2005-2006 Ken West
 2006-2007 Lori West
 2007-2008 A.M. James Shapiro
 2008-2009 Greg Knoll
 2009-2010 Lee Anne Tibbles
 2010-2011 Marcelo Cantarovich
 2011-2013 Tom Blydt-Hansen
 2013-2015 Steven Paraskevas
 2015-2017 Atul Humar
 2017-2019 Michael Mengel
 2019-2021 Joseph Kim
 2021-(Present) Jeffrey Schiff

References

Canadian Institute for Health Information website
Canadian Organ Replacement Registry website

External links

Professional associations based in Canada
Transplant organizations
Medical and health organizations based in Ontario